Gustaf Andersson (3 December 1885 – 17 April 1969) was a Swedish sports shooter. He competed at the 1924 Summer Olympics and the 1932 Summer Olympics.

References

External links
 

1885 births
1969 deaths
Swedish male sport shooters
Olympic shooters of Sweden
Shooters at the 1924 Summer Olympics
Shooters at the 1932 Summer Olympics
Sportspeople from Västra Götaland County